Red Rock ( pronounced , meaning "Rock Red town") is a town in northern Noble County, Oklahoma, United States. The population was 283 at the 2010 census, a decline from 293 at the 2000 census. The headquarters of the Otoe-Missouria Tribe of Indians is located in Red Rock.

History
In 1886, the Atchison, Topeka and Santa Fe Railroad built a line through what would become Noble County. The land around the railroad crossing of Red Rock Creek still belonged to the Otoe-Missouri reservation, but Rufus N. Dunagan operated a trading post there. A post office named "Magnolia" opened at the trading post in March 1890. The name was changed to Red Rock in June 1892.  A Santa Fe train was robbed by the Dalton Gang in this locale on June 1, 1892.  

On April 26, 1991, a large F4 tornado touched down within one mile of the town. The tornado was rated F4 because of the minimal damage that occurred. But the tornado held the record for the highest recorded wind speed of 270 mph until the Bridge Creek, Oklahoma tornado of May 3, 1999, in the 1999 Oklahoma tornado outbreak, which had a wind gust of 318 mph.

Geography
Red Rock is located at  (36.459934, -97.179226).

Demographics

As of the census of 2000, there were 293 people, 97 households, and 71 families residing in the town. There were 107 housing units at an average density of 438.1 per square mile (172.1/km2). The racial makeup of the town was 20.48% White, 73.72% Native American, and 5.80% from two or more races. Hispanic or Latino of any race were 1.02% of the population.

There were 97 households, out of which 36.1% had children under the age of 18 living with them, 49.5% were married couples living together, 17.5% had a female householder with no husband present, and 26.8% were non-families. 24.7% of all households were made up of individuals, and 14.4% had someone living alone who was 65 years of age or older. The average household size was 3.02 and the average family size was 3.68.

In the town, the population was spread out, with 32.8% under the age of 18, 10.9% from 18 to 24, 22.9% from 25 to 44, 19.5% from 45 to 64, and 14.0% who were 65 years of age or older. The median age was 31 years. For every 100 females, there were 87.8 males. For every 100 females age 18 and over, there were 87.6 males.

The median income for a household in the town was $17,031, and the median income for a family was $23,750. Males had a median income of $23,750 versus $16,875 for females. The per capita income for the town was $7,185. About 30.4% of families and 34.7% of the population were below the poverty line, including 45.3% of those under the age of eighteen and 30.6% of those 65 or over.

Education
In 1989, the Red Rock School District consolidated with the Marland district. The consolidated district was renamed Frontier School District.

Sports
The Frontier Mustangs have made it to the state basketball tournament 14 consecutive times (the longest running record in Oklahoma) and have won six state championships in the 20 years of the school's existence.

Notable people
Della Warrior (born 1946), raised in Red Rock, served as first and (so far, only) female chair of the Otoe-Missouria Tribe. Also was president of the Institute of American Indian Arts.
Sanora Babb (April 21, 1907 – December 31, 2005), born in Red Rock, was an American novelist, poet, and literary editor.
Benjamin Arkeketa (1928-2002), Navajo painter

Notes

Towns in Noble County, Oklahoma
Towns in Oklahoma
Otoe